The Party for a European Future (Partija za Evropska Idnina) is a political party in North Macedonia that largely represents Macedonian Muslims.

In the 2006 legislative elections, the party won 1 out of 120 seats. The party ran on the elections held on 1 June 2008, and again won 1 seat in the parliament. In the 2011 elections, it lost that seat.

The leader of the party is Fijat Canoski.

References

External links

Agrarian parties
Political parties established in 2006
Political parties of minorities in North Macedonia
Pro-European political parties in North Macedonia